North Branch is an unincorporated community in Allegany County, Maryland, United States.  The Western Maryland Railroad Right-of-Way, Milepost 126 to Milepost 160 was listed on the National Register of Historic Places in 1981.

References

Unincorporated communities in Allegany County, Maryland
Unincorporated communities in Maryland
Populated places on the North Branch Potomac River